Mr. Lee (born Leroy Haggard Jr. in 1968), sometimes credited as Lee Haggard or Mr. Lee & Kompany, is an American hip-house rapper, producer and DJ from Chicago, Illinois. He is known in the Chicago house music scene as one of the pioneers who brought hip hop to the genre, which would later be coined as hip house.

Mr. Lee charted three times on the Billboard Hot Dance Music/Club Play chart with "Get Busy" (#2, 1989), "Pump That Body" (#1, 1990) and "Get Off" (#32, 1992). His tracks "Pump Up London" (#64, 1988) and "Get Busy" (#41, 1989) featured in the UK Singles Chart. Mr. Lee released two albums, Get Busy in 1990 and I Wanna Rock Right Now in 1992.

Discography

Albums
 Get Busy (1990)
 I Wanna Rock Right Now (1992)

Singles

See also
List of number-one dance hits (United States)
List of artists who reached number one on the US Dance chart

References

American house musicians
American hip hop DJs
Hip house musicians
Living people
1968 births
Jive Records artists
Musicians from Chicago
Electronic dance music DJs